Julian Charles John Lennon (born John Charles Julian Lennon; 8 April 1963) is an English musician, photographer, and philanthropist. He is the son of Beatles member John Lennon and his first wife, Cynthia, and he is named after his paternal grandmother, Julia Lennon. Julian inspired three Beatles songs: "Lucy in the Sky with Diamonds" (1967), "Hey Jude" (1968) and "Good Night" (1968). His parents divorced in 1968 after his father had an affair with Yoko Ono.

Lennon started a music career in 1984 with the album  Valotte, best known for its lead single "Too Late for Goodbyes", and has since released six more albums. He has held exhibitions of his fine-art photography and has had several children's books published. In 2006, Lennon produced the environmental documentary film WhaleDreamers, which won eight international awards. In 2007, he founded The White Feather Foundation (TWFF), whose stated mission goal is to address "environmental and humanitarian issues".

In 2018, Lennon was executive producer of the documentary film Women of the White Buffalo, which chronicles the lives of women living on the Lakota Pine Ridge Indian Reservation. In 2020, Lennon was executive producer of the Netflix documentary Kiss the Ground about regenerative agriculture.

Early life 
Julian Lennon was born John Charles Julian Lennon, on 8 April 1963 at Sefton General Hospital in Liverpool to John Lennon and Cynthia Powell. He was named after his paternal grandmother, Julia Lennon, who died five years before his birth. The Beatles' manager, Brian Epstein, was his godfather. Lennon was educated at Ruthin School, a boarding private school in the town of Ruthin in Denbighshire in North Wales.

Lennon inspired one of his father's most famous songs, "Lucy in the Sky with Diamonds", whose lyrics describe a picture the boy had drawn, a watercolour painting of his friend, Lucy O'Donnell, from nursery school, surrounded by stars. Another composition of his father inspired by him was the lullaby "Good Night", the closing song of The Beatles (also known as The White Album). In 1967, at the age of four, he attended the set of the Beatles' film Magical Mystery Tour.

When Julian was five years old in 1968, his parents divorced following his father's infidelity with Japanese multimedia artist Yoko Ono. John Lennon married Ono on 20 March 1969. Julian would later have a younger half-brother, Sean Lennon.

Paul McCartney wrote "Hey Jude" to console him over the divorce; originally called "Hey Jules", McCartney changed the name because he thought that "Jude" was an easier name to sing. After his parents' divorce, Julian had almost no contact with his father until the early 1970s when, at the request of his father's then-girlfriend, May Pang (Yoko Ono and Lennon had temporarily separated), he began to visit his father regularly. John Lennon bought him a Gibson Les Paul guitar and a drum machine for Christmas 1973 and encouraged his interest in music by showing him some chords.

Relationship with his father 
Following his father's murder on 8 December 1980, Julian Lennon voiced anger and resentment towards him, saying, "I've never really wanted to know the truth about how dad was with me. There was some very negative stuff talked about me ... like when he said I'd come out of a whiskey bottle on a Saturday night. Stuff like that. You think, where's the love in that? Paul  and I used to hang about quite a bit ... more than Dad and I did. We had a great friendship going and there seems to be far more pictures of me and Paul playing together at that age than there are pictures of me and my dad".

Julian chafed at hearing his father's peace and love stance perpetually celebrated. He told The Daily Telegraph, "I have to say that, from my point of view, I felt he was a hypocrite." He added, "Dad could talk about peace and love out loud to the world but he could never show it to the people who supposedly meant the most to him: his wife and son. How can you talk about peace and love and have a family in bits and pieces—no communication, adultery, divorce? You can't do it, not if you're being true and honest with yourself".

Recalling his renewed contact with his father in the mid-1970s, he said in 2009, "Dad and I got on a great deal better then. We had a lot of fun, laughed a lot and had a great time in general when he was with May Pang. My memories of that time with Dad and May are very clear — they were the happiest time I can remember with him".

Julian was excluded from his father's will. However, a trust of £100,000 was created by his father to be shared between Julian and his half brother Sean. Julian sued his father's estate and in 1996 reached a settlement agreement, authorised by Lennon's widow Yoko Ono, reportedly worth £20 million.

In an interview with CBS News in 2009, he stated, "I realized if I continued to feel that anger and bitterness towards my dad, I would have a constant cloud hanging over my head my whole life. After recording the song 'Lucy,' almost by nature, it felt right to fulfill the circle, forgive dad, put the pain, anger and bitterness in the past, and focus and appreciate the good things. Writing is therapy for me and, for the first time in my life, I'm actually feeling it and believing it. It also has allowed me to actually embrace Dad and the Beatles."

Career

Music career 
Aside from the Beatles, Lennon was influenced by David Bowie, Keith Jarrett, Steely Dan, and AC/DC.

Lennon made his musical debut at age 11 on his father's album Walls and Bridges playing drums on "Ya-Ya", later saying, "Dad, had I known you were going to put it on the album, I would've played much better!" In the sleeve notes in the album the song is credited to Julian Lennon "starring on drums" with "dad on piano".

Lennon enjoyed immediate success with his debut album, Valotte, released in 1984. Produced by Phil Ramone, it spawned two top 10 hits, (the title track and "Too Late for Goodbyes") and earned Lennon a nomination for the Grammy Award for Best New Artist in 1985. Music videos for the two hits were made by film director Sam Peckinpah and producer Martin Lewis. After the album's release, Paul McCartney sent Lennon a telegram wishing him good luck.

His second album, 1986's The Secret Value of Daydreaming, was panned by critics. However, it reached number 32 on the Billboard 200 chart and produced the single "Stick Around", which was Lennon's first number-one single on the US Album Rock Tracks chart. He recorded the song "Because", previously recorded by The Dave Clark Five, in the UK for Clark's 1986 musical Time.

On 1 April 1987, Julian Lennon appeared as the Baker in Mike Batt's musical The Hunting of the Snark (based on Lewis Carroll's poem). The all-star lineup included Roger Daltrey, Justin Hayward and Billy Connolly, with John Hurt as the narrator. The performance, a musical benefit at London's Royal Albert Hall in aid of the deaf, was attended by the Duchess of York. In October the same year he performed with Chuck Berry. Although Lennon never achieved the same level of success in the US as he had enjoyed with Valotte, his 1989 single "Now You're in Heaven" peaked at number 5 in Australia and gave him his second number 1 hit on the Album Rock Tracks chart in the US.

In 1991, George Harrison sent some ideas for Lennon's album Help Yourself, which included the single "Saltwater" although he did not play or receive any credits. The single "Saltwater" reached number 6 in the UK and topped the Australian singles charts for four weeks. During this time, Lennon contributed a cover of the Rolling Stones' "Ruby Tuesday" to the soundtrack of the television series The Wonder Years.

Lennon left the music business for several years in the 1990s to focus on philanthropy after his encounter with elders from the Mirning people of Australia. After he began his performing career, there was occasionally unfounded media speculation that Lennon would undertake performances with McCartney, Harrison and Ringo Starr. In the Beatles Anthology series in 1995, the three surviving Beatles confirmed there was never an idea of having Julian sit in for his father as part of a Beatles reunion, with McCartney saying, "Why would we want to subject him to all of this?"

In May 1998, Lennon released the album Photograph Smile to little commercial success. Music critic Stephen Thomas Erlewine praised the album as "well-crafted and melodic", and concluded by saying that it was "the kind of music that would receive greater praise if it weren't made by the son of a Beatle". In 2002, he recorded a version of "When I'm Sixty-Four", from the Beatles' Sgt. Pepper's Lonely Hearts Club Band album, for an Allstate Insurance commercial.

In 2006 he ventured into Internet businesses, including MyStore.com with Todd Meagher and Bebo founder Michael Birch. In 2009 Lennon created a new partnership with Meagher and Birch called theRevolution, LLC. Through this company, Lennon released a tribute song and EP, "Lucy", honouring the memory of Lucy Vodden (née O'Donnell), the little girl who inspired the song "Lucy in the Sky with Diamonds", with 50 per cent of the proceeds going to fund Lupus research.

In October 2011, Lennon released the album Everything Changes. In 2012 he worked with music film director Dick Carruthers on the feature-length video documentary Through the Picture Window, which followed Lennon's journey in the making of Everything Changes and includes interviews with Steven Tyler, Bono, Gregory Darling, Mark Spiro and Paul Buchanan from The Blue Nile. Through the Picture Window was also released as an app in all formats with bespoke videos for all 14 tracks from the album.

On September 9, 2022, the comeback album Jude was released on BMG. It included the singles "Freedom" and "Every Little Moment". Goldmine wrote about the release, "With his new album, the first in 11 years, Julian advances his body of work that has always simultaneously explored personal and global themes, but for the first time in his life, he's embracing his inner status as someone's son...[an] introspective masterwork from a diversely talented artist." The title is a reference to the Beatles song "Hey Jude", which Paul McCartney wrote in 1968 to give Julian Lennon hope for the future. Lennon said about his album title, "Calling it Jude was very coming of age for me in that regard because it was very much facing up to who I am...The content came from over three decades of songwriting. The themes and issues mostly being the same, generally about the wars within and the wars without."

Film 
Lennon's first tour as a solo musician, in early 1985, was documented as part of the film Stand By Me: A Portrait Of Julian Lennon — a film profile started by Sam Peckinpah, but completed by Martin Lewis after Peckinpah's death. Lennon has appeared in several other films including The Rolling Stones Rock and Roll Circus (released 1996, originally filmed in 1968), Cannes Man (1996), Imagine: John Lennon (1988), Chuck Berry: Hail! Hail! Rock 'n' Roll (1987) and a cameo in Leaving Las Vegas (1995) as a bartender. Julian provided the voice for the title role in the animated film David Copperfield (1993). He was also the voice of the main character Toby the Teapot in the animated special The Real Story of I'm a Little Teapot (1990).

Lennon is also the producer of the documentary, WhaleDreamers, about an Indigenous Australian tribe and the peoples' special connection with whales. It also touches on many environmental issues. This film received several awards and was shown at the 2007 Cannes Film Festival.

In 2018, Lennon was an executive producer of Women of the White Buffalo, a documentary film focused on several Lakota women from Pine Ridge Indian Reservation in South Dakota, and their work to preserve their way of life in the face of colonialism.

Photography 
After photographing his half-brother Sean's music tour in 2007, Lennon took up a serious interest in photography.

On 17 September 2010, Lennon opened an exhibition of 35 photographs called "Timeless: The Photography of Julian Lennon" with help from long-time friend and fellow photographer Timothy White. Originally scheduled to run from 17 September to 10 October, the Morrison Hotel Gallery extended it a week to end 17 October. The photographs include shots of his brother Sean and U2 frontman Bono.

Lennon's "Alone" collection was featured at the Art Basel Miami Beach Show from 6–9 December 2012, to raise money for The White Feather Foundation.

Lennon's "Horizons" series was featured at the Emmanuel Fremin Gallery, NYC, 12 March 2015, to 2 May 2015.

Lennon's "Cycle" exhibit was featured at the Leica Gallery in Los Angeles, in the fall of 2016.

Lennon is a prolific user of the photography app Instagram.

In 2021, Lennon became the first fine-arts photographer featured at the new gallery in Aston Martin Residences Miami.

Books 
Shortly after the death of his father, Lennon began collecting Beatles memorabilia. In 2010, he published a book describing his collection, entitled: Beatles Memorabilia: The Julian Lennon Collection.

In 2017, Lennon began a New York Times Bestselling trilogy, Touch the Earth, Heal the Earth and Love the Earth, which he completed in 2019.

On 9 November 2021, Lennon published a graphic novel for middle-grade children, The Morning Tribe, with co-author Bart Davis.

Philanthropy 
A conversation Lennon once had with his father went as follows: "Dad once said to me that should he pass away, if there was some way of letting me know he was going to be OK – that we were all going to be OK – the message would come to me in the form of a white feather. ... the white feather has always represented peace to me". Then Julian, while on a tour in Australia, received a white feather from two Indigenous elders of the Mirning tribe in Adelaide, Australia, asking for him to help give them a voice. In response, he produced the documentary Whaledreamers about their tribe, and in 2007 he founded The White Feather Foundation (TWFF), whose mission "embraces environmental and humanitarian issues and in conjunction with partners from around the world helps to raise funds for the betterment of all life, and to honor those who have truly made a difference."

TWFF partners with philanthropists and charities around the world to raise funds for various humanitarian projects in four major areas of giving: clean water, the preservation of Indigenous cultures, the environment and education and health. In 2008, the Prince of Monaco Albert II presented TWFF with the Better World Environmental Award.

In 2015, after the Nepal earthquake, TWFF contributed $106,347.52 to the Music for Relief's Nepal aid fund to support the victims of the earthquake.

Lennon visited Kenya, Ethiopia and Colombia in 2014 to witness the education and environmental initiatives by TWFF. After his mother's death the following year, Lennon announced that he would be naming TWFF's scholarship program to Kenyan girls after her: "The Cynthia Lennon Scholarship for Girls". Since then, the Foundation has awarded over 40 scholarships to girls in Kenya and in 2021 expanded the scholarship to art students in the U.S.

In 2019, Lennon contributed his voice and music to the soundtrack of narrative feature film "One Little Finger", which has the initiative to spread awareness about 'ability in disability'. It shows how important and powerful music is to support societal and cognitive development of people with disabilities.

In September 2020, Lennon was honoured with the CC Forum Philanthropy Award in Monaco. That same month, he was named a UNESCO Center for Peace 2020 Cross-Cultural and Peace Crafter Award Laureate.

In 2022 Lennon recorded his version of his father's 1971 song Imagine with all proceeds going to support Ukraine.

Personal life 

After living with his parents at Kenwood in Weybridge outside London from 1964 to 1968, Lennon moved with his mother to The Wirral near Liverpool and then to a farm in North Wales. Lennon's first step-father, Roberto Bassanini, whom his mother married in 1970, was Italian. Lennon moved to the United States in the early 1980s where he resided in New York City and then Los Angeles. In 1991, Lennon moved to Europe, and resided mainly in Italy where Bassanini had lived (Lennon dedicated Photograph Smile to Bassanini in 1998). Lennon then moved to Monaco where he currently resides, and he counts Albert II, Prince of Monaco as a friend.

Lennon has been quoted as having a reasonably "cordial" relationship with Ono, following the financial settlement against his late father's estate. He remains close to her son, Sean, his half-brother. Julian saw Sean perform live for the first time in Paris on 12 November 2006 at La Boule Noire, and he and Sean spent time together on Sean's tour in 2007.

Lennon has never married or had children, revealing in 2011 that his difficult relationship with his father had discouraged him from doing so.

In commemoration of John Lennon's 70th birthday and as a statement for peace, Lennon and his mother, Cynthia, unveiled the John Lennon Peace Monument in his home town of Liverpool, on 9 October 2010.

Lennon remains friends with his father's former bandmate Paul McCartney, though they experienced a brief public falling out in 2011 when Lennon was not invited to McCartney's wedding to Nancy Shevell. According to Lennon, McCartney later assured him that "someone obviously made a huge mistake" and the snub had not been intentional. McCartney provided the handwritten "Jude" motif for Lennon's 2022 album.

In 2020, he legally changed his name from John Charles Julian Lennon to Julian Charles John Lennon to reflect the name he has always been known by.

Discography 

 Valotte (1984)
 The Secret Value of Daydreaming (1986)
 Mr. Jordan (1989)
 Help Yourself (1991)
 Photograph Smile (1998)
 Everything Changes (2011)
 Jude (2022)

Filmography

Films 
 As Producer
 WhaleDreamers (2008)
 Kiss the Ground (2020)
 Women of the White Buffalo (2021)

Television appearances 
 Top of the Pops (18 October 1984)
 American Bandstand (29 December 1984)
 Solid Gold (TV series) (2 February 1985)
 Live at Five (WNBC TV series) (18 February 1985)
 Late Night with David Letterman (10 April 1985)
 The Tonight Show Starring Johnny Carson (12 June 1985)
 American Bandstand (26 April 1986)
 Top 20 Countdown (3 May 1986)
 Solid Gold (13 September 1986)
 The Arsenio Hall Show (15 June 1989)
 Today (American TV program) (19 June 1989)
 Late Night with David Letterman (28 July 1989)
 The Tonight Show Starring Johnny Carson (16 August 1989)
 Top of the Pops (3 October 1991)
 Late Night with David Letterman (18 October 1991)
 Late Show with David Letterman (17 February 1999)
 The Tonight Show with Jay Leno (9 March 1999)
 The Howard Stern Show (1 May 1999)
 The Tonight Show with Jay Leno (11 August 1999)
 Daybreak (19 September 2011)
 Larry King Now (16 July 2013)
 Chelsea Lately (28 October 2013)
 The Tonight Show with Jay Leno (21 November 2013)
 The View (19 April 2017)
 Access Hollywood (25 April 2017)
 The Chew (6 April 2018)
 Home and Family (16 April 2018)
 American Chopper (28 March 2019)
 The View (talk show) (24 April 2019)
 Home and Family (30 April 2019)
 Ways to change the world (18 November 2022)

References

External links 

 Julian Lennon's official website
 Julian Lennon Photography
 The White Feather Foundation
 
 Timeless : Julian Lennon photo exhibition at the Morrison Gallery Hotel (17 September – 17 October 2010)

1963 births
Living people
20th-century English singers
21st-century English singers
21st-century photographers
Atlantic Records artists
Art rock musicians
English expatriates in Italy
English expatriates in Monaco
English male composers
English male guitarists
English male singers
English male singer-songwriters
English multi-instrumentalists
English people of Irish descent
English philanthropists
English pop guitarists
English pop rock singers
English pop singers
English rock guitarists
English rock singers
John Lennon
Julian
Musicians from Liverpool
Singers from Liverpool